Petropavl or Petropavlovsk  is a city on the Ishim River in northern Kazakhstan close to the border with Russia. It is the capital of the North Kazakhstan Region. Population: 218,956. The city is also known colloquially in Kazakh as Kyzylzhar ("Red Cliff").

Physical-geographical characteristics

Geographical location 
Petropavl is located in the southwestern part of the West Siberian Plain, on the right bank of the Ishim river, the longest tributary of the Irtysh river. Not far from Petropavl there are many lakes and ponds, for example: Lake Bolshoe Beloe, Lake Pestroye, Lake Kishtibish, Lake Maloe Beloe and Bitter lake. Also, within the city can be found small forests, mostly consisting of birches and pine plantations.

Climate
The climate is a dry version of the humid continental (Köppen Dfb) type, with sharp winter-summer temperature fluctuations. In spring, prevails clear and dry weather, with a large number of sunny days. Summers are quite hot, with a predominance of clear, often dry weather, in some years the rains can be of different frequencies, from rare and up to passing to a cloudy and rainy summer. Autumn begins in August or September, and the weather is observed from clear at the beginning of the season, to cloudy in October–November.

Based on 1981 to 2010 means:
 The average relative humidity of the air is 73.8%.

Population 
National composition (at the beginning of 2020):

Russians — 129,970 people (59.28%);
Kazakhs — 65,739 people (29.99%);
Tatars — 6573 people (3,00 %);
Ukrainians — 4,500 people (2,05 %);
Germans — 4237 people (1.93%);
Poles — 1036 people (0.47%);
Belarusians — 969 people (0.44%);
Azerbaijanis — 931 people (0.42%);
Armenians — 921 people (0.42%);
Tajiks — 886 people (0.40%);
Uzbeks — 275 people (0.13%);
and others — 3194 people (1.46%).
Total-219,231 inhabitants.

Symbolism of the city

The first coat of arms the district city of Petropavlovsk, Tobolsk province, was approved on September 7, 1842 (law No. 16351): In the upper half of the shield, the coat of arms of Tobolsk. In the lower one, " in a silver field on a mountain, a camel loaded with two bales at the ready and led by a rope by an Asiatic."
The modern coat of Arms is made in the form of a circle with a traditional Kazakh ornament around the perimeter and is a stylized Scythian shield. The ornament of the coat of arms includes Shanyrak, which divides the circle into 4 parts, each of which depicts 4 main elements that characterize Petropavlovsk of the beginning of the 21st century. In the upper sector there is a key-a symbol of the geographical location of the city, "Northern gate of Kazakhstan". This is followed by a sheaf of wheat, which is important for the city of agriculture and agricultural processing enterprises. The lower part shows an open book, symbolizing the high cultural and educational level of the city. The next sector is occupied by gear-industry and manufacturing. The song ends with a ribbon with the name of the city in the state language.

History

Petropavlovsk was founded in the summer of 1752 as a military fortress of Saint Peter and is located on the site of the Kyzyl-Zhar tract, on the right bank of the Ishim river. Initially, it was considered a military outpost and was a major trading center in the North of the Kazakh khanate.

In the 14th and15th centuries, the Kazakh khanate was formed on the territory of modern Kazakhstan, consisting of three zhuzs. Each of them had common routes of nomads and a common territory. The middle zhuz of the Kazakhs, consisting of the Argyn, Kerey, Kongrat and Naiman tribes, occupied the Northern, North-Eastern and Central parts of Kazakhstan. Their main occupation was nomadic and semi-nomadic cattle breeding.

In the middle of the 17th century, the Kazakh-Dzungar Wars began. During the war for their lands, the Kazakhs were forced to migrate to the southern steppes. In this regard, in the 17th century and at the beginning of the 18th century, in Northern Kazakhstan, the nomadic population is rare. In the 18th century, the war for the return of Northern Kazakhstan continued. The southern part of the steppes and areas of North-Eastern Kazakhstan became the battleground of the Kazakhs and Dzungars.

At this time, the Kazakh khans decided to accept Russian citizenship: the Younger zhuz took citizenship in 1731 and later in 1740, the middle zhuz took citizenship. In the steppe, defensive fortifications were built, among these fortifications was the fortress of St. Peter.

Within the Russian Empire

Map of the Tobolsk Viceroyalty, 1792. The fortress of St. Petra in the southern part.
In 1752, during the reign of Elizabeth Petrovna, the Senate, in order to strengthen the southern borders of the Russian Empire, recognized the need to urgently begin construction of a new Ishim line. By a decree of the Senate of February 25, 1752, General Kinderman was ordered to build a line of fortifications from the Omsk fortress on the Irtysh to the Beast's Head tract on Tobol. 
In June 1752, an expedition consisting of Dragoons of the Lutsk regiment, foot soldiers of the Noteburg regiment and a battalion of the Vologda Dragoon regiment, almost 2 thousand people, moved to the tract on the Ishim river. A small forest, nestled up against the floodplain of lake Babalawo Dragoons crossed to the right Bank of the Ishim river. Two steep ravines that bounded the construction site, went to the Ishim and together with the steep Bank of a wide (up to 47 m) river created a natural barrier to the enemy. The expedition had to build a large fortification in a short time — the fortress of St. Petersburg. Peter and two small-fortress Noon and Swan, and between them 8 redoubts. Given the imminent onset of cold weather, we decided to build wooden fortifications.

The fortress on Ishim had the shape of a regular hexagon with an area of about 2 hectares. At the corners of its equal distance located the bastions connected by curtain walls. The bastions facing the river were called Nagorny and Ishim. The total length of the fortress fence was more than 1.3 km. In the bastions were placed guns, inside the fortress-barracks, stables, officers ' houses, garrison Church, powder magazine, and other premises. Hard work exhausted the soldiers and Cossacks, as well as poor nutrition and early cold weather. People got sick, many died, and escapes became more frequent.

In early October, snow fell and work was stopped. In addition to the officers, 50 Dragoons and 40 soldiers remained in the fortress. In severe winter conditions, a small garrison provided constant surveillance of the steppe, watching for signs of distress from nearby redoubts. The fortress was connected with Russia by a chain of post stations. In the spring of 1753, construction resumed.

The area of the fortress was soon built up to the limit, and some rooms were built outside the walls of the fortress. So, later formed the Upper forstadt-on the mountain, and in the Foothills-the Lower forstadt. Forstadt is a settlement where the main role is played by the fortress and the military. In the Lower forstadt there is a Cossack village, a hospital, and a locksmith's shop. For security reasons, the suburb was surrounded by a fence. The entrance and exit were guarded by special guards.

As well as other fortified points in Siberia, the fortress of SV. Petra was strengthened militarily: the garrison was increased, wooden walls and bastions were replaced with earthen ones. The barracks were rebuilt, and a "salt house" was built to receive representatives of Kokand. According to the instructions of the Senate, kolodniki exiled to Siberia for hard labor (up to 100-300) were used for the work. In 1772, the fortress had two suburbs: the upland part and the foothills. The merchant class grew, as the fortress became a major political and economic center of the priishimye region.

Thanks to Abylai Khan, the fortress became a major point of exchange and transit trade, which influenced the economic development of the steppe. Trade routes from Russia and Central Asia converged here.

Local Kazakhs borrowed from immigrants skills of mowing, tillage, fisheries, veterinary medicine, etc.

In 1782, in the fortress of St. In the presence of the Governor-General of the Ufa and Simbirsk governorates, I. V. Yakobi, the Sultan of the Middle Zhuz, Vali Khan, took the solemn oath of allegiance to the Russian government.He was officially confirmed as a Khan by the Russian Empire.

In 1807, the fortress was renamed the city of Petropavlovsk with the addition of Tobolsk province. On September 7, the first mayor of the fortress was appointed. Peter (retired major Levashov with a salary of 300 rubles).

By a nominal decree of January 22, 1822 "on the division of the Siberian provinces into Western and Eastern administrations", Siberia was divided into Western (center — Tobolsk) and Eastern (center — Irkutsk). Petropavlovsk was classified as a medium-sized city and became a district city of the newly formed Omsk region, assigned to the Western main administration.

In 1824, the Petropavlovsk district of the Omsk region was formed with the administrative center in Petropavlovsk, where offices were opened. In 1825, the city government was organized. In the same year, the first city budget was drawn up and the first city head was appointed, which was the merchant F. Zenkov.

On April 16, 1838, Petropavlovsk was made a minor city of Ishimsky uyezd of Tobolsk province, since the Omsk region was abolished.

In 1868, on November 4, when the Akmola region was formed (it existed in 1868-1919) with the center in Omsk, Petropavlovsk became a district city in this region.

During the war with Napoleon, citizens and peasants twice sent recruits and voluntarily donated about 30 thousand rubles to the defense of the Fatherland.

On may 11, 1849, a fire broke out, destroying 450 houses. After that, the new construction began according to the plan approved by the Tsar. The author of the plan was the architect Chernenko, who did not take into account the features of the soil and terrain, and the Foothills more than once sank in spring floods. The relocation of peasants from European Russia and the construction of the Siberian railway contributed to the development of the city.

Petropavlovsk oil production supplied oil to St. Petersburg, Moscow, Riga, revel, Odessa, Samara, Vladivostok, as well as to England, Germany and Denmark. The largest were the Zenkov brothers ' tannery, and the factory for processing the intestines of the Swiss Accola. According to the census of 1897, there were 20014 people living in Petropavlovsk[the source is not specified 3714 days]. Accounted for the bulk of Russians, Kazakhs, there were about 1500 people. A significant group were the Tatars-immigrants. According to the source "Cities of Russia in 1910" St. Petersburg, 1914 in 1910, 37,973 people lived in Petropavlovsk, including by national composition: Russians — 72.8%, Turkish-Tatars — 25.2%, poles — 0.5%, Jews-1.1%, Germans-0.2%, Finns-0.2 %.

For a long time, a distinctive feature of the city remained the low level of improvement, lack of Sewerage, cluttered streets, unsanitary condition of bazaars and slaughterhouses, which contributed to the spread of diseases. The city had one hospital with 10 beds. By 1900, there were 13 educational institutions in the city, including one fifth-grade school, one women's gymnasium, two parochial schools, one parish school, two village schools, and six Tatar schools. The largest enterprise in the city was a cannery, built in 1915, which employed 100 people. There were nine mosques in the city, of which six were made of stone.

In 1896, the Petropavlovsk railway station of the South Ural railway was built near the city as part of the TRANS-Siberian railway.

In Soviet period
In 1918, Petropavlovsk became one of the centers of the white movement. On may 31, the Siberian Cossacks of chief V. I. Volkov, with the support of the Czechoslovaks, overthrew the Soviet government. Colonel Pankratov became the commandant of the city. The ideological justification for the resistance was the support of the Constituent Assembly COSSACKS PRIISHIMJE AT the BEGINNING of the CIVIL WAR (summer 1918). During the Peter and Paul operation of the 5th army on October 31, 1919, Soviet power was restored in the city.

In 1919-1921. Petropavlovsk is a district city in the Omsk province of the RSFSR.

On August 26, 1920, the decree of the Central Executive Committee and the SNK of the RSFSR on the formation of the Autonomous Kyrgyz Republic (1920-1925), later the Cossack ASSR, was signed. Then four uyezds of the Omsk province of the RSFSR (existed in 1919-1925) (Atbasar, Akmolinsky, Kokchetavsky and Petropavlovsk) temporarily remained under the jurisdiction of the Sibrevkom until the final decision of the Extraordinary authorized Commission of the Kaztsik on the reception of this territory. The Commission had two main tasks. First, to prepare the conditions for the implementation of administrative reform, as a result of which Petropavlovsk from a district city was to become the administrative center of the Akmola province. Secondly, to establish the borders of this province with other provinces of the RSFSR. On April 26, 1921, the resolution of the Extraordinary authorized Commission of Kaztsik on the admission and organization of the Akmola province with the administrative center in the city of Petropavlovsk was issued.

From April 26, 1921 to January 17, 1928, Petropavlovsk was the administrative center of the Akmola province of the Kirghiz (from 1925 — Kazak) ASSR, which existed in 1920-1928[20].

From January 17, 1928 to may 10, 1928, Petropavlovsk was the administrative center of the Kyzyl-Zhar district of the Kazakh ASSR.

From May 10, 1928 to December 17, 1930, Petropavlovsk was the administrative center of the Petropavlovsk district of the Cossack ASSR.

From December 17, 1930 to March 10, 1932, Petropavlovsk was directly controlled by the Republican government of the Cossack ASSR.

1932–36 years. Petropavlovsk is the administrative center of the Karaganda region of the Kazakh ASSR.

From 1936 to the present, Petropavlovsk is the regional center of the established North Kazakhstan region within the Kazakh SSR and since 1991 the Republic of Kazakhstan.

In 1941, the great Patriotic war began in the USSR; many heavy machinery factories were evacuated to the deep rear. At that time, Petropavlovsk was also a deep rear. Such factories operating in Petropavlovsk as the V. I. Lenin Plant, the S. M. Kirov Plant, and the V. V. Kuibyshev Plant were built in Petropavlovsk to build heavy equipment, i.e. tanks, armored personnel carriers, and so on. At the moment, factories produce and assemble small equipment.

As part of independent Kazakhstan
In 2008, Petropavl took part in the contest "The best city in the CIS", where he was awarded three grants, including the grant "for the preservation of historical and cultural heritage".

In 2014, the trolleybus system was abolished.

On November 27, 2018, the rural localities of Kuibyshevskoye village, Novopavlovka village, Teplovskoye village, and Stop point 2629 located on the territory of the city akimat of Petropavlovsk were incorporated directly into the city of Petropavlovsk.

Education
There are 43 organizations of preschool education, 38 secondary schools, 13 colleges, 5 higher educational institutions in Petropavlovsk.

Culture

Theatres
The Petropavl theater is named after the Kazakh writer Sabit Mukanov. Performances are in the Kazakh language. Russian-speaking viewers are given headphones. Headphones are included in the armrest of the chair in the hall. Thanks to this, the audience can understand the speech of Kazakh-speaking actors. 

Petropavl's regional puppet theatre has been operating since February 1991. It is located in a building on 69 Vasilieva street. In addition to children's performances, it used to show films and hold new year's matinees.
The theater has been named after the Soviet playwright, winner of the Lenin prize N. F. Pogodin since 1986. Performances for children (in the morning) and adults (in the evening) are performed on the stage. The theater has a theater Studio for young actors.

Museums
The North Kazakhstan regional museum of local history opened in 1924. In the hall of the Museum there is a large map of the North Caucasus-on the entire wall. In the Museum you can see objects of antiquity and modernity. The flora and fauna of the North Caucasus region is very richly represented on the first floor in the form of stuffed animals against the background of their natural habitat.

There are military items, a Yurt, Kazakh national clothing, and a Department dedicated to President N. Nazarbayev.

The North Kazakhstan regional museum of fine arts opened in 1989. The Museum has permanent exhibitions, sometimes exhibitions are held. For example, exhibitions of the artist Krestnikov, children's drawings.

The North Kazakhstan regional Philharmonic society was opened in 1965 on the basis of the concert and variety Bureau of the city Palace of culture.

Transportation

Petropavl has a railway station with connections to the Russian capital Moscow and Kazakhstan's capital Astana.

Sports
The city's bandy team in the Spartakiade 2009 on home ice was victorious. In 2013 it was hosted in Petropavl again, this time the team from Khromtau won. 12–17 December 2016 the Kazakh Cup, to the memory of Kazbek Baybulov, was played at Stadium Karasay in Petropavl. The home team Volna captured the bronze medal.

Olympic gold medal winning cyclist Alexander Vinokourov is a native of nearby Bishkul.

Twin towns – sister cities

Petropavl is twinned with:
 Omsk, Russia

See also
Administrative building of the North-Kazakhstan regional executive committee

References

External links

Official website
Informal website

Cities and towns in Kazakhstan
Populated places established in 1752
Akmolinsk Oblast (Russian Empire)
Populated places in North Kazakhstan Region